Charles Dewell Moore (born January 3, 1940) is a former American football offensive lineman in the National Football League (NFL) for the Washington Redskins.  He played college football at the University of Arkansas.

References

1940 births
Living people
American football offensive guards
Arkansas Razorbacks football players
Washington Redskins players
People from Marianna, Arkansas